The Great Southern Railways Class 800 steam locomotives were built principally for express passenger work on the Dublin to Cork main line of that company. These locomotives were designed under the supervision of E. C. Bredin with his Chief Draughtsman, H. J. A. Beaumont, preparing the drawings. They were the largest and most powerful engines ever to run in Ireland by quite a large margin, and the only three express passenger locomotives to be built in an independent Ireland.

Design
The engines had three  cylinders and  boiler pressure.
Further, it was the only design which exploited the full extent of the extra width afforded by the  gauge. Originally four or five were to be built, named Maeḋḃ, Maċa, Táilte, Gráinne, and Deirdre, but only three were eventually produced - 800 Maeḋḃ in 1939, with Maċa (801) and Táilte (802) in 1940, along with a fourth boiler which acted as a spare. They were intended for the Dublin–Cork route, but wartime coal shortages and the early 1950s advent of diesels on main line services resulted in their never having had much chance to show what they were capable of. In the 1950s, they gradually became neglected and even resorted to light goods trains on occasion, with little other work to do.

The name and number plates were of cast bronze with polished raised lettering and beading on a blue painted background. The nameplates’ lettering was in Gaelic script using dot above in place of the 'h' (see Irish orthography), although at first locomotive 800 was planned to carry an Anglicised name Maeve in Roman type, though it never did.

No. 800 Maeḋḃ was withdrawn from service in 1962 and is now on display at the Ulster Folk and Transport Museum, Cultra, Co. Down.

Livery
The engines were turned out in a unique livery, which no other locomotives ever carried. In the height of the Great Southern era, when every single locomotive in Ireland was painted in plain unlined battleship grey livery, these engines were turned out in a smart mid-green, with a distinct bluish tint. The green was lined in black and light yellow, and the GSR coat of arms was carried on the tender, flanked by large pale yellow letters "G S", which appear to have been shaded in red and gold. The cabside number plates and nameplates had blue backgrounds, and raised polished brass rims and numerals.

In Córas Iompair Éireann days, they received the 1950s standard green, somewhat darker than they had carried before, with black and white lining. In the early 1950s, Táilte was apparently repainted a light green, as an experiment. The colour was not unlike the green used for coaches on CIÉ in the late 1950s, but she was then repainted like her sisters. Maċa and Táilte'''s nameplates and cab side number plates were given red backgrounds in the mid-1950s instead of the dark blue that they had originally, however Maeḋḃ retained the blue background. This is the livery the preserved 800 carries, though rather than the CIÉ "flying snail" emblem which would be appropriate to this later livery, it incorrectly carries the earlier "G S" without shading, and a replaced GSR coat of arms.

Service

The locos entered service between 1939 and 1940. Their axle load was 21 tons which meant that they could only work on the Dublin-Cork mainline. They were noted for climbing the steeply graded route from Cork Kent station (then Glanmire road station) unassisted, but because of coal shortages after WWII they never got a chance to show their full potential. They were slightly modified in the early 1950s with Maċa and Táilte receiving single funnels and all three gaining extra hand-railings and a wheel on the smoke-box door instead of a dart. The main difference following these modifications was a decrease in tractive effort. 

With the arrival of the Metropolitan-Vickers A class first generation diesel locomotives in the 1950s, they were made virtually redundant, with Táilte being taken out of service in 1955 and scrapped two years later. However, Maeḋḃ and Maċa remained in service pulling light expresses and goods trains. Maeḋḃ was taken out of service in 1962 and was repainted at Inchicore for preservation. Both Nos. 800 and 801 were noted for being at Thurles in the 1960s after withdrawal. Maċa was retubed for an IRRS tour in 1964 and was steamed up for the last time, after which she was scrapped. Having been at Thurles for a year 800 was brought to the Belfast Museum. In 1993, Maeḋḃ, along with the NCC compound Dunluce Castle and the GNR S class 4-4-0 No. 171 Slieve Gullion'' were brought to the new Ulster Folk and Transport Museum, Cultra.

Models
An etched-brass 4 mm scale model is available from Studio Scale Models.  There is a detailed O Gauge model of engine 800 in the Fry model railway collection.

See also
 Coaching stock of Ireland
 Diesel locomotives of Ireland
 Multiple units of Ireland
 Steam locomotives of Ireland

References

Steam locomotives of Ireland
Steam locomotives of Northern Ireland
4-6-0 locomotives
Railway locomotives introduced in 1939
800
Passenger locomotives
5 ft 3 in gauge locomotives